The Select Stakes was a Group 3 flat horse race in Great Britain open to horses aged three years or older. It was run at Goodwood over a distance of 1 mile, 1 furlong and 192 yards (1,986 metres), and it was scheduled to take place each year in September.

History
The event was established in 1965, and it was originally called the Valdoe Stakes. It was initially open to horses aged four or older, and the inaugural running was contested over a mile. The following year's edition was run as a handicap.

The race was restricted to three and four-year-olds in 1973, and it was re-opened to older horses in 1976. It was renamed the Select Stakes and promoted from Listed to Group 3 status in 1986. It was discontinued in 2012.

Records
Most successful horse (2 wins):
 Knifebox – 1992, 1993

Leading jockey (4 wins):
 Michael Roberts – Mtoto (1988), Filia Ardross (1991), Knifebox (1993), Mutamam (1998)

Leading trainer (3 wins):
 Dick Hern – Bolide (1979), Prince Bee (1981), Morcon (1983)
 Alec Stewart – Mtoto (1988), Filia Ardross (1991), Mutamam (1998)
 Saeed bin Suroor – Triarius (1995), Moon Ballad (2002), Pictavia (2006)
 Marcus Tregoning – Ekraar (2000), Nayef (2001), Alkaadhem (2004)

Winners

 The 1968 race was cancelled due to local flooding.

 The 1974 edition was abandoned because of a waterlogged course.

 The 1979 running took place at Sandown Park.

See also
 Horse racing in Great Britain
 List of British flat horse races
 Recurring sporting events established in 1965 – this race is included under its original title, Valdoe Stakes.

References

 Paris-Turf: 
 Racing Post:

 galopp-sieger.de – Select Stakes (ex Valdoe Stakes).
 horseracingintfed.com – International Federation of Horseracing Authorities – Select Stakes (2011).
 pedigreequery.com – Select Stakes – Goodwood.
 

Flat races in Great Britain
Goodwood Racecourse
Open middle distance horse races
Discontinued horse races